Hennadiy Anatoliyovych Shchekotylin (born 28 July 1974) is a retired Ukrainian professional footballer.

References
Shchkotylin at football.odessa

External links

1974 births
Living people
Footballers from Odesa
Ukrainian footballers
Ukrainian expatriate footballers
Expatriate footballers in Lithuania
Expatriate footballers in Kazakhstan
Ukrainian expatriate sportspeople in Lithuania
Ukrainian expatriate sportspeople in Kazakhstan
Association football midfielders
FC Chornomorets Odesa players
FC Chornomorets-2 Odesa players
FC Naftokhimik Kremenchuk players
FC Dynamo-2 Kyiv players
FC Dynamo-3 Kyiv players
FC CSKA Kyiv players
FC Kryvbas Kryvyi Rih players
FC Hoverla Uzhhorod players
MFC Mykolaiv players
FC Oleksandriya players
FC Ivan Odesa players
FC Šiauliai players
FC Vostok players
Ukrainian Premier League players
Ukrainian football managers